This article is a list of United States Air Force recruiting squadrons both active, inactive, and historical. The purpose of a United States Air Force recruiting squadron is to provide a means of reaching out to the public in order to recruit people for service within the air force.

List

See also
List of United States Air Force squadrons

References

External links
United States Air Force Recruiting Service

Recruiting